A Night of Terror is a 1911 American silent film comedy directed by Edwin S. Porter. The film is one of the earliest comedies produced by Thomas Edison. It was released by Edison Manufacturing Company as a split reel with the film The Old Family Bible.

Plot
A traveler fears his ax-wielding innkeeper, but he’s just killing a chicken for supper.

References

External links

1911 films
American silent short films
1911 comedy films
Silent American comedy films
1911 short films
American black-and-white films
American comedy short films
Films produced by Thomas Edison
Films directed by Edwin S. Porter
1910s American films